Guoli is a town in Huantai County, Zibo, in central Shandong province, China. , it has one residential community and 65 villages under its administration.

References

Township-level divisions of Shandong
Huantai County